During the 2002–03 Belgian football season, K.R.C. Genk competed in the Belgian First Division.

Season summary
Genk had a disappointing season and finished sixth, failing to qualify for any European competitions. They did accomplish the feat of making their debut in the Champions League group stages, but only picked up 4 points and finished bottom of their group.

First-team squad
Squad at end of season

Results

UEFA Champions League

Third qualifying round

Genk 4–4 Sparta Prague on aggregate. Genk won on away goals.

Group stage

References

Notes

K.R.C. Genk
K.R.C. Genk seasons